Andrey Kuznetsov and Aleksandr Nedovyesov were the defending champions, but only Aleksandr Nedovyesov returned to defend his title, partnering up with Denys Molchanov.
Matteo Donati and Andrey Golubev beat second seeds Denys Molchanov and Aleksandr Nedovyesov 3–6, 7–6(7–5), [10–1]

Seeds

Draw

References
 Main Draw

City of Onkaparinga ATP Challenger - Doubles
2016 Doubles
2016 in Australian tennis